The non-marine molluscs of Cameroon are a part of the molluscan fauna of Cameroon (wildlife of Cameroon).

A number of species of non-marine molluscs are found in the wild in Cameroon.

Freshwater gastropods 

Thiaridae
 Cleopatra bulimoides (Olivier, 1804)
 Melanoides tuberculata (Müller, 1774)

Ampullariidae
 Lanistes ovum Peters, 1845
 Pila wernei (Philippi, 1851)

Planorbidae
 Biomphalaria camerunensis (C.R. Boettger, 1941)
 Biomphalaria pfeifferi (Krauss, 1848)
 Bulinus camerunensis Mandahl-Barth, 1957
 Bulinus forskalii (Ehrenberg, 1831)
 Bulinus globosus (Morelet, 1866)
 Bulinus senegalensis Müller, 1781
 Ceratophallus natalensis (Krauss, 1848)

Lymnaeidae
 Radix natalensis (Krauss, 1848)

Land gastropods 
Land gastropods in Cameroon include:

Punctidae
 Punctum camerunense de Winter, 2017

Streptaxidae
 Avakubia fruticicola de Winter & Vastenhout, 2013
 Avakubia semenguei de Winter & Vastenhout, 2013
 Avakubia subacuminata de Winter & Vastenhout, 2013
 Costigulella primennilus de Winter, 2008
 Gulella kuiperi de Winter, 2007
 Sinistrexcisa cameruniae De Winter, Gomez & Prieto, 1999 - from Southwest Cameroon

Freshwater bivalves

See also 
 List of marine molluscs of Cameroon

Lists of molluscs of surrounding countries:
 List of non-marine molluscs of Nigeria, Wildlife of Nigeria
 List of non-marine molluscs of Chad, Wildlife of Chad
 List of non-marine molluscs of the Central African Republic, Wildlife of the Central African Republic
 List of non-marine molluscs of Equatorial Guinea, Wildlife of Equatorial Guinea
 List of non-marine molluscs of Gabon, Wildlife of Gabon
 List of non-marine molluscs of the Democratic Republic of the Congo, Wildlife of the Democratic Republic of the Congo

References

External links 
  Ailly A. d' (1896). Contributions a la connaissance des mollusques terrestres et d'eau douce de Kaméroun. P.A. Norstedt & Söner, Stockholm. With 5 plates of drawings by Georg Liljevall (1848-1928). scan at Internet Archive.

Molluscs
Cameroon
Cameroon